Roller Office Supply is a property in Grand Forks, North Dakota that was listed on the National Register of Historic Places in 1982.  It was deemed significant architecturally as one of just two red brick / stone trimmed commercial buildings in Grand Forks from the 1888-1892 period (the other is Iddings Block).

It is an Early Commercial-style two-story brick rectangular-plan building.

The listing was for an area of less than one acre with just the one contributing building.

The property was covered in a 1981 study of Downtown Grand Forks historical resources.

See also
Iddings Block

References

Commercial buildings on the National Register of Historic Places in North Dakota
Buildings designated early commercial in the National Register of Historic Places in North Dakota
Vernacular architecture in North Dakota
National Register of Historic Places in Grand Forks, North Dakota